The siege of Adrianople took place in 378 following the Gothic victory at the Battle of Adrianople. Gothic forces were unable to breach the city walls and retreated. It was followed by an unsuccessful Gothic attempt to breach the walls of Constantinople.

References

Adrianople
Adrianople 378
Adrianople
370s in the Byzantine Empire
378
History of Edirne